Jan Łazarski (26 October 1892 – 11 August 1968) was a Polish cyclist. He competed in two events at the 1924 Summer Olympics winning a silver medal in the men's team pursuit.

References

External links
 

1892 births
1968 deaths
Polish male cyclists
Olympic cyclists of Poland
Cyclists at the 1924 Summer Olympics
Olympic silver medalists for Poland
Olympic medalists in cycling
Medalists at the 1924 Summer Olympics
Sportspeople from Kraków
Polish Austro-Hungarians